A speckle is a small spot or speck on the skin, plumage or foliage.

Speckle, speckles or speckled may also refer to:

People 
 Daniel Speckle (AKA Daniel Specklin, 1536–1589), Alsatian fortress architect, engineer, and cartographer

Science and technology 
 Dynamic speckle
 Speckle imaging
 Speckle masking
 Speckle noise
 Speckle pattern
 Speckle tracking echocardiography
 Nuclear speckles, also known as Splicing speckles, also known as interchromatin granule clusters

Fiction 
 Speckles, a leopard toy character
 Speckle Frew, a fictional island in The Books of Abarat
 Speckles and Speckles Junior,  male Tarbosauri in the 2012 film The Dino King and  its 2017 sequel Dino King: Journey to Fire Mountain